Mohamed ElSherbini (born 15 September 1992 in Alexandria) is an Egyptian professional squash player. As of February 2018, he was ranked number 75 in the world.

References

1992 births
Living people
Egyptian male squash players
21st-century Egyptian people